is a Japanese manga series written and illustrated by Kei Kamiki. It was serialized in Shueisha's Weekly Shōnen Jump magazine from June 2020 to February 2022, with its chapters collected into nine tankōbon volumes. Viz Media has licensed the series for English release in North America.

Plot
In a remote beachside town in the present day, middle school student Ruru Miyanagi finds and accidentally releases Magu from the sealing crystal. Although Magu tells her of his Godly status, Ruru is unimpressed and the two form an unlikely relationship; the lonely Ruru looks at him as a friend of equal status, while Magu considers her his lowly human disciple. Having sensed Magu, the God of Madness Naputaaku breaks out of his sealing crystal and the two continue their rivalry to rule humans, although both have lost most of their power. After learning that they both hate Magu, Naputaaku and Ruru's friend Ren Fujisawa form an alliance. The young Holy Knight Izuma Kisaragi makes occasional appearances in the town trying to stop Magu from taking it over. Izuma is often accompanied by Uneras, the God of Providence who betrayed her fellow Gods of Chaos and sided with the Holy Knights, leading to their sealing 600 years earlier.

Characters

A middle school student, she is kind and carefree but gullible and a little dense. Her father died when she was young, and her mother  is rarely home as she works on the other side of the sea, thus Ruru is often lonely.

A God of Chaos, ranked in the First Pillar, and the God of Destruction, who has massive destructive abilities. But as a result of having been sealed in the crystal, his physical body is much smaller; resembling an octopus, and his powers much weaker. His goal is to regain his powers and amass a following like the former Cult of Chaos, which he thinks he is doing by having others sign their name in "The Book of the Destruction Disciples' Blood Oaths" (really Ruru's old BFF book).

Ruru's friend and classmate who has a crush on her. Unlike Ruru, Ren is suspicious of the Gods and vows to protect her. He tries to get closer to Ruru and ask her out on dates, but most are ruined as she always brings Magu along. In order to keep Magu quiet about his crush, Ren is the first to sign "loyalty" to Magu in his BFF book. His family owns and runs a local restaurant, .

A God of Chaos, ranked in the Fifth Pillar. He is the God of Madness, earning him the nickname "Naputaaku the Mad", and has the power to control living beings by instilling madness in their minds. He too has lost his size and powers because of a sealing crystal, and now looks like a starfish. Using his ability, he is only able to recruit an army of 100 hermit crabs to do his bidding. Naputaaku becomes friendly with Ren and starts working at his family's restaurant, where he develops a love for cooking.

A God of Chaos, ranked in the Fourth Pillar, who betrayed them and sided with the Holy Knights, leading to Magu and the other Gods being sealed in the crystals she created. She is the God of Providence, earning her the nickname "Providential Uneras", and can infuse objects with magic by altering the laws of nature. Unlike Magu and Naputaaku, Uneras is knowledgeable and curious about modern human society. She fakes being caught by the Knights so that she can enjoy the luxuries they provide her in exchange for her protecting them from the other Gods. As her real body is locked up in the Holy Knights' headquarters, she appears as a clione that hides in a sleeve on the leg of Izuma's pigeon.

A 16-year-old descendant of the Holy Knights from another country. He has sworn to eradicate the Gods of Chaos and can detect the "aura of chaos" they give off. Izuma is under the impression that Ruru is under the control of the evil Magu and repeatedly tries to save her. He has a homing pigeon that acts as a lookout. Unable to beat Magu, Izuma eventually enrolls at Ruru's middle school to keep an eye on him, despite being high school age.

Ruru's rambunctious and fun-loving friend and classmate. She loves to tease and is labelled an "innocent brat," who is without malice or regret. This is proven when she is found to be the only one unaffected by Zonze Ge's power. As a result, she takes Zonze Ge as her pet.

Ruru's friend and classmate who is obsessed with aliens, cryptids and the occult. She immediately recognizes Magu and the other Gods as not of this world and is interested in researching them. She was the only member of the school's Occult Research Club until her friends and Magu join to save it from disbandment. She takes Gu La home as a pet.

A being of the same race as the Gods of Chaos, but "undeserving" of being ranked as a God. He is constantly insecure and depressed and his power instills these feelings into any being that touches him, earning him the nickname "Zonze Ge of Despair". Because he looks like a sea urchin ("uni" in Japanese), Yuika gives him the nickname "Unisuke".

A being of the same race as the Gods of Chaos, but not ranked as a God, although he does desire the title. He looks like a crab and is known as "Gu La the Adamantine". His power allows him to regenerate and strengthen his physical form and transform his claws into various items.

A God of Chaos, ranked in the Third Pillar, and the leader of the Chaos Cult in the modern day. His power allows him to predict and adjust the future, earning him the nicknames "Muscar of Fate" and "The Prophet". Although he predicted Uneras' betrayal, he accepted the sealing so that he could break out first and restore his power while hiding. Muscar can take any form he desires, but took on the appearance of a human boy to avoid detection by Uneras, though he does wear robes resembling a squid. He hates humans and his plan is to have the Gods of Chaos take over the world once again.

A God of Chaos, ranked in the Sixth Pillar, who is extremely lazy and always sleeping. Nicknamed "Nosu Koshu of Illusions", she has the power to put living beings to sleep and control their dreams, which she feeds on. Nosu Koshu is initially freed from her sealing crystal by Muscar to aid him in taking over the world.

Production

Magu-chan: God of Destruction is  first serialized work. After having drawn a bunch of one-shots for special issues of Weekly Shōnen Jump, but no success getting published in the main magazine, Kamiki's editor Monji suggested he choose a genre he likes for a new work. A fan of series like Pokémon, Shin Megami Tensei: Devil Children, Medabots and Gotcha Force, the author decided to draw something about a small creature companion. The one-shot version of Magu-chan: God of Destruction was rejected by Weekly Shōnen Jump but published in Jump Giga 2019 Summer Vol. 3. Kamiki was credited by the name  for the one-shot.

His editor suggested he rework the manga, draw three chapters and try to get it serialized in Weekly Shōnen Jump one more time. Kamiki made Magu rounder and said the BFF book was his editor's idea. Magu-chan: God of Destruction was picked up for serialization. The author said he came up with a pen name to use when he got serialized in Jump, but his editor rejected it. After working with Monji for over eight years, Kamiki's editor changed during the making of volume two. His second editor, Ishikawa, left around September 2021.

Kamiki acknowledged that the series has elements of "a certain fictional mythos" but said it is really "a mishmash of all sorts of things" and he wants readers to treat it as an "entirely separate" work. He described Magu as something like "what you get when you mix rabbit ears, a pancake devilfish, and the disposition of a cat into one creature." He said that Naputaaku holds the record for the character he can draw the fastest, at about 30 seconds. Kamiki revealed that the character Uneras is based on a lot of things, but became a clione "because of Crypto's drones," which is presumably a reference to Apex Legends. He also explained that the spells in the series do not actually mean anything, but are "just stuff that sounds like spells."

Publication
Written and illustrated by Kei Kamiki, Magu-chan: God of Destruction began serialization in Weekly Shōnen Jump on June 22, 2020, and ended on February 7, 2022. A 41-page additional chapter was published in the Spring 2022 issue of Jump Giga on May 2, 2022. Publisher Shueisha collected the individual chapters into nine tankōbon volumes between November 4, 2020, and June 3, 2022. Both Shueisha and Viz Media began releasing the series in English the same day it began in Japan, the former on its Manga Plus website and application. Viz Media has also licensed the collected volumes for digital-only release, with the first volume released on September 28, 2021.

Volume list

Other media
The first three chapters of Magu-chan: God of Destruction received a motion comic adaptation, where voice actors, music and sound effects are heard as the manga images appear on screen. The episodes were uploaded to Jump Comic's official YouTube channel, with the first chapter uploaded in two parts on November 18, 2020 and November 19, 2020, and the second and third chapters uploaded on January 6, 2021 and January 7, 2021 respectively.

The first newly created merchandise for the series were mini plushies of Magu-chan, which were released on July 19, 2021 and sold out immediately.

Reception
Magu-chan: God of Destruction was nominated for Best Print Manga at the 2021 Next Manga Awards, where it placed 15th out of 50 nominees. The series came in fourth place in AnimeJapan's 2022 poll of manga series people want to see receive an anime adaptation.

Reiichi Narima of Real Sound described the series as a gag comedy set in real life that draws from the Cthulhu Mythos, and compared it to Fujiko Fujio's Little Ghost Q-Taro. He said that while this might seem like a surprising combination, it works in the same way other Japanese series have yōkai and other monsters happily interacting with children. Narima called the scenery of the rural seaside town where the manga takes place "fresh" and a "hidden highlight." He called Magu-chan: God of Destruction an "oasis for the mind" after reading its tense Weekly Shōnen Jump battle manga counterparts Jujutsu Kaisen and Chainsaw Man, and expressed his wish that it will continue for a long time. Comic Book Resources' Hannah Collins also compared Magu to H. P. Lovecraft's Cthulhu.

Reviewing the early chapters, The Fandom Posts Antonio Mireles wrote that Kamiki chose a weird mixture for a comedy, but this "mixture of various tropes of dark comedy, with hints of tragedy, romance, and battle manga" works wonders. He praised the cast and their enjoyable interactions; the relationship between Ruru and Magu, and Ren for providing an outsider's view of their uncanny relationship. Mireles cited the art as the manga's greatest challenge: "There are instances where Kei Kamiki can draw charming images or frightful terrifying images that will shake you to your core. And then there are many moments where it feels like its a rough sketch that should have been worked on a bit more." However, in a review of chapter nine, he stated that the art saw a massive upgrade.

References

External links
 Magu-chan: God of Destruction on the Official Shueisha website 
 Magu-chan God: of Destruction on Manga Plus
 Magu-chan: God of Destruction on the Official Viz website
 

Comedy anime and manga
Shōnen manga
Shueisha manga
Viz Media manga